Barren Fork is a stream in Miller and Pulaski counties in the U.S. state of Missouri. It is a tributary of Brushy Fork.

Barren Fork most likely was so named due to the lack of heavy timber along its course.

See also
List of rivers of Missouri

References

Rivers of Miller County, Missouri
Rivers of Pulaski County, Missouri
Rivers of Missouri